Storm in a Teacup may refer to:

Film and television
 Storm in a Teacup (film), a 1937 British film
 "A Storm in a Teacup" (Porridge), a 1977 television episode

Literature
 "A Storm in a Teacup" (short story), a 1920 story by Lu Xun
 Storm in a Teacup: The Physics of Everyday Life, a 2016 book by Helen Czerski

Music
 "Storm in a Teacup" (The Fortunes song), 1971
 "Storm in a Teacup", a song by Badfinger from Magic Christian Music, 2010 reissue
 "Storm in a Teacup", a song by Erasure from Light at the End of the World, 2007
 "Storm in a Teacup", a song by Milburn from Well Well Well, 2006
 "Storm in a Teacup", a song by the Red Hot Chili Peppers from Stadium Arcadium, 2006

Other uses
 Storm in a teacup (idiom), or tempest in a teapot, an idiom meaning a small event that has been exaggerated
 Storm in a Teacup (company), an Italian video game developer

See also 
 Teacup in a Storm, a Hong Kong radio talk program